Kaashoek is a surname. Notable people with the surname include:
 Frans Kaashoek (born 1965), Dutch mathematician and computer scientist 
 Rien Kaashoek (born 1937), Dutch mathematician